Olof Georg Rydeberg (21 July 1907 – 22 February 1983) was a Swedish film actor. He appeared in more than 70 films between 1932 and 1981. He was married to the Finnish actress Birgit Sergelius.

Partial filmography

 International Match (1932)
 Dear Relatives (1933)
 Love and Dynamite (1933)
 False Greta (1934)
 Fired (1934)
 Walpurgis Night (1935)
 Adolf Strongarm (1937)
  Russian Flu (1937)
 Dollar (1938)
 A Woman's Face (1938)
 Emilie Högquist (1939)
 Lärarinna på vift (1941)
 In Paradise (1941)
 If I Could Marry the Minister (1941)
Home from Babylon (1941)
 Doctor Glas (1942)
 Dangerous Ways (1942)
 The Case of Ingegerd Bremssen (1942)
 Ombyte av tåg (1943)
 Som du vill ha mej (1943)
 Gentleman with a Briefcase (1943)
 Appassionata (1944)
 Harald the Stalwart (1946)
 Two Women (1947)
 Life Starts Now (1948)
 The Firebird (1952)
 For the Sake of My Intemperate Youth (1952)
 The Green Lift (1952)
 Bread of Love (1953)
 Hidden in the Fog (1953)
 The Shadow (1953)
 Storm Over Tjurö (1954)
 Laugh Bomb (1954)
 The People of Hemsö (1955)
 Whoops! (1955)
 The Girl in Tails (1956)
 The Biscuit (1956)
 The Minister of Uddarbo (1957)
 Night Light (1957)
 Seventeen Years Old (1957)
 A Dreamer's Journey (1957)
 The Judge (1960)
 People Meet and Sweet Music Fills the Heart (1967)
 Hour of the Wolf (1968)
 Vindingevals (1968)
 Göta kanal eller Vem drog ur proppen? (1981)

References

External links

1907 births
1983 deaths
Swedish male film actors
Eugene O'Neill Award winners
20th-century Swedish male actors